The Polish resistance movement in World War II (Polski ruch oporu w czasie II wojny światowej), with the Polish Home Army at its forefront covered both German and Soviet zones of occupation. The Polish resistance is most notable for disrupting German supply lines to the Eastern Front (damaging or destroying 1/8 of all rail transports), providing intelligence reports to the British intelligence agencies (providing 43% of all reports from occupied Europe), and for saving more Jewish lives in the Holocaust than any other Western Allied organization or government. It was a part of the Polish Underground State.

Organizations
The largest of all Polish resistance organizations was the Armia Krajowa (Home Army, AK), loyal to the Polish government in exile in London. The AK was formed in 1942 from the Union of Armed Struggle (Związek Walki Zbrojnej or ZWZ, itself created in 1939) and would eventually incorporate most other Polish armed resistance groups (except for the communists and some far-right groups). It was the military arm of the Polish Underground State and loyal to the Polish government in Exile.

Most of the other Polish underground armed organizations were created by a political party or faction, and included:
 The Bataliony Chłopskie (Peasants' Battalions). Created by the leftist People's Party around 1940–1941, it would partially merge with AK around 1942–1943.
 The Gwardia Ludowa WRN (People's Guard of WRN) of Polish Socialist Party (PPS) (joined ZWZ around 1940, subsequently  merged into AK)
 The Konfederacja Narodu (Confederation of the Nation). Created in 1940 by far-right Obóz Narodowo Radykalny-Falanga (National Radical Camp Falanga). It would partially merge with ZWZ around 1941 and finally join AK around fall 1943.
 The Narodowa Organizacja Wojskowa (National Military Organisation), established by the National Party in 1939, mostly integrated with AK around 1942.
Narodowe Siły Zbrojne (National Armed Forces); created in 1943 from dissatisfied NOW units, which refused to be subordinated to the AK.
 The Obóz Polski Walczącej (Camp of Fighting Poland), established by the Obóz Zjednoczenia Narodowego (Camp of National Unity) around 1942, subordinated to AK. in 1943.

The largest groups that refused to join the AK were the National Armed Forces and the pro-Soviet and communist People's Army (Polish Armia Ludowa or AL), backed by the Soviet Union and established by the Polish Workers' Party (Polish Polska Partia Robotnicza or PPR).

"Within the framework of the entire enemy intelligence operations directed against Germany, the intelligence service of the Polish resistance movement assumed major significance. The scope and importance of the operations of the Polish resistance movement, which was ramified down to the smallest splinter group and brilliantly organized, have been in (various sources) disclosed in connection with carrying out of major police security operations." Heinrich Himmler, 31 December 1942

Size
In February 1942, when AK was formed, it numbered about 100,000 members. In the beginning of 1943, it had reached a strength of about 200,000. In the summer of 1944 when Operation Tempest began, AK reached its highest membership numbers, though the estimates vary from 300,000 to 500,000. The strength of the second largest resistance organization, Bataliony Chłopskie (Peasants' Battalions), can be estimated for summer 1944 (at which time they were mostly merged with AK) at about 160,000 men. The third largest group include NSZ (National Armed Forces) with approximately 70,000 men around 1943–1944; only small parts of that force were merged with AK. At its height in 1944, the communist Armia Ludowa, which never merged with AK, numbered about 30,000 people. One estimate for the summer 1944 strength of AK and its allies, including NSZ, gives its strength at 650,000.  Overall, the Polish resistance have often been described as the largest or one of the largest resistance organizations in World War II Europe.

Actions, operations, and intelligence, 1939–1945

1939

On 9 November 1939, two soldiers of the Polish army—Witold Pilecki and Major Jan Włodarkiewicz—founded the Secret Polish Army (Tajna Armia Polska, TAP), one of the first underground organizations in Poland after defeat. Pilecki became its organizational commander as TAP expanded to cover not only Warsaw but Siedlce, Radom, Lublin and other major cities of central Poland. By 1940, TAP had approximately 8,000 men (more than half of them armed), some 20 machine guns and several anti-tank rifles. Later, the organization was incorporated into the Union for Armed Struggle (Związek Walki Zbrojnej), later renamed and better known as the Home Army (Armia Krajowa).

1940

In March 1940, a partisan unit of the first guerrilla commanders in the Second World War in Europe under Major Henryk Dobrzański "Hubal" destroyed a battalion of German infantry in a skirmish near the village of Huciska. A few days later in an ambush near the village of Szałasy it inflicted heavy casualties upon another German unit. To counter this threat the German authorities formed a special 1,000 men strong counter-insurgency unit of combined SS–Wehrmacht forces, including a Panzer group. Although the unit of Major Dobrzański never exceeded 300 men, the Germans fielded at least 8,000 men in the area to secure it.

In 1940, Witold Pilecki, an intelligence officer for the Polish resistance, presented to his superiors a plan to enter Germany's Auschwitz concentration camp, gather intelligence on the camp from the inside, and organize inmate resistance. The Home Army approved this plan, provided him a false identity card, and on 19 September 1940, he deliberately went out during a street roundup (łapanka) in Warsaw and was caught by the Germans along with other civilians and sent to Auschwitz. In the camp he organized the underground organization -Związek Organizacji Wojskowej - ZOW. From October 1940, ZOW sent its first report about the camp and the genocide in November 1940 to Home Army Headquarters in Warsaw through the resistance network organized in Auschwitz.

During the night of 21–22 January 1940, in the Soviet-occupied Podolian town of Czortków, the Czortków Uprising started; it was the first Polish uprising during World War II. Anti-Soviet Poles, most of them teenagers from local high schools, stormed the local Red Army barracks and a prison, in order to release Polish soldiers kept there.

At the end of 1940 Aleksander Kamiński created a Polish youth resistance organization, known as "Wawer". It was part of the Szare Szeregi (the underground Polish Scouting Association). This organisation carried out many minor sabotage operations in occupied Poland. Its first action was drawing graffiti in Warsaw around Christmas Eve of 1940 commemorating the Wawer massacre. Members of the AK Wawer "Small Sabotage" units painted "Pomścimy Wawer" ("We'll avenge Wawer") on Warsaw walls. At first they painted the whole text, then to save time they shortened it to two letters, P and W. Later they invented Kotwica -"Anchor" - which became the symbol of all Polish resistance in occupied Poland.

1941

From April 1941 the Bureau of Information and Propaganda of the Union for Armed Struggle started Operation N headed by Tadeusz Żenczykowski. It involved sabotage, subversion and black-propaganda activities.

From March 1941, Witold Pilecki's reports were forwarded to the Polish government in exile and through it, to the British and other Allied governments. These reports informed the Allies about the Holocaust and were the principal source of intelligence on Auschwitz-Birkenau for the Western Allies.

On 7 March 1941, two Polish agents of the Home Army killed Nazi collaborator actor Igo Sym in his apartment in Warsaw. In reprisal, 21 Polish hostages were executed. Several Polish actors were also arrested by the Nazis and sent to Auschwitz, among them such notable figures as directors Stefan Jaracz and Leon Schiller.

In July 1941 Mieczysław Słowikowski (using the codename "Rygor" — Polish for "Rigor") set up "Agency Africa", one of World War II's most successful intelligence organizations. His Polish allies in these endeavors included Lt. Col. Gwido Langer and Major Maksymilian Ciężki.  The information gathered by the Agency was used by the Americans and British in planning the amphibious November 1942 Operation Torch landings in North Africa.  These were the first large-scale Allied landings of the war, and their success in turn paved the way for the Allies' Italian campaign.

1942

On 20 June 1942, the most spectacular escape from Auschwitz concentration camp took place. Four Poles, Eugeniusz Bendera, Kazimierz Piechowski, Stanisław Gustaw Jaster and Józef Lempart made a daring escape. The escapees were dressed as members of the SS-Totenkopfverbände, fully armed and in an SS staff car. They drove out the main gate in a stolen Steyr 220 automobile with a smuggled report from Witold Pilecki about the Holocaust. Three of the escapees remained free until the end of the war; Jaster, who joined the Polish Underground, was recaptured in 1943 and died shortly afterwards in German custody.

In September 1942 "The Żegota Council for the Aid of the Jews" was founded by Zofia Kossak-Szczucka and Wanda Krahelska-Filipowicz ("Alinka") and made up of Polish Democrats as well as other Catholic activists. Poland was the only country in occupied Europe where there existed such a dedicated secret organization. Half of the Jews who survived the war (thus over 50,000) were aided in some shape or form by Żegota. The best-known activist of Żegota was Irena Sendler, head of the children's division, who saved 2,500 Jewish children by smuggling them out of the Warsaw Ghetto, providing them with false documents, and sheltering them in individual and group children's homes outside the ghetto.

In 1942 Jan Karski reported to the Polish, British and U.S. governments on the situation in Poland, especially the Holocaust of the Jews. He met with Polish politicians in exile including the prime minister, and members of political parties such as the Socialist Party, National Party, Labor Party, People's Party, Jewish Bund and Poalei Zion. He also spoke to Anthony Eden, the British foreign secretary, and included a detailed statement on what he had seen in Warsaw and Bełżec.

The Zamość Uprising was an armed uprising of Armia Krajowa and Bataliony Chłopskie against the forced expulsion of Poles from the Zamość region  under the Nazi Generalplan Ost. The Germans attempted to remove the local Poles from the Greater Zamość area (through forced removal, transfer to forced labor camps, or, in some cases, mass murder) to get it ready for German colonization. It lasted from 1942 until 1944 and despite heavy casualties suffered by the Underground, the Germans failed.

On the night from 7 to 8 October 1942 Operation Wieniec started. It targeted rail infrastructure near Warsaw. Similar operations aimed at disrupting and harrying German transport and communication in occupied Poland occurred in the coming months and years. It targeted railroads, bridges and supply depots, primarily near transport hubs such as Warsaw and Lublin.

1943

In early 1943 two Polish janitors of Peenemünde's Camp Trassenheide provided maps, sketches and reports to Armia Krajowa Intelligence, and in June 1943 British intelligence had received two such reports which identified the "rocket assembly hall', 'experimental pit', and 'launching tower'. When reconnaissance and intelligence information regarding the V-2 rocket became convincing, the War Cabinet Defence Committee (Operations) directed the campaign's first planned raid (the Operation Hydra bombing of Peenemünde in August 1943) and Operation Crossbow.

On 26 March 1943 in Warsaw Operation Arsenal was launched by the Szare Szeregi (Gray Ranks) Polish Underground The successful operation led to the release of arrested troop leader Jan Bytnar "Rudy". In an attack on the prison, Bytnar and 24 other prisoners were freed.

In 1943 in London Jan Karski met the then much known journalist Arthur Koestler. He then traveled to the United States and reported to President Franklin D. Roosevelt. His report was a major factor in informing the West. In July 1943, again personally reported to Roosevelt about the situation in Poland. He also met with many other government and civic leaders in the United States, including Felix Frankfurter, Cordell Hull, William Joseph Donovan, and Stephen Wise. Karski also presented his report to media, bishops of various denominations (including Cardinal Samuel Stritch), members of the Hollywood film industry and artists, but without success. Many of those he spoke to did not believe him, or supposed that his testimony was much exaggerated or was propaganda from the Polish government in exile.

In April 1943 the Germans began deporting the remaining Jews from the Warsaw ghetto provoking the Warsaw Ghetto Rising, 19 April to 16 May. Polish Underground State ordered Ghetto Action - a series of combat actions carried out by the Home Army during the uprising between 19 April 1943 and May 16, 1943.

Some units of the AK tried to assist the ghetto rising, but for the most part, the resistance was unprepared and unable to defeat the Germans. One Polish AK unit, the National Security Corps (Państwowy Korpus Bezpieczeństwa), under the command of Henryk Iwański ("Bystry"), fought inside the ghetto along with ŻZW.  Subsequently, both groups retreated together (including 34 Jewish fighters). Although Iwański's action is the most well-known rescue mission, it was only one of many actions undertaken by the Polish resistance to help the Jewish fighters. In one attack, three cell units of AK under the command of Kapitan Józef Pszenny ("Chwacki") tried to breach the ghetto walls with explosives, but the Germans defeated this action. AK and GL engaged the Germans between 19 and 23 April at six different locations outside the ghetto walls, shooting at German sentries and positions and in one case attempting to blow up a gate. Participation of the Polish underground in the uprising was many times confirmed by a report of the German commander - Jürgen Stroop.

In August 1943 the headquarters of the Armia Krajowa ordered Operation Belt which was one of the large-scale anti-Nazi operations of the AK during the war. By February 1944, 13 German outposts were destroyed with few losses on the Polish side.

Operation Heads began:  the serial executions of German personnel who had been sentenced to death by Polish underground Special Courts for crimes against Polish citizens in German-occupied Poland.

On 7 September 1943, the Home Army killed Franz Bürkl during Operation Bürkl. Bürkl was a high-ranking Gestapo agent responsible for the murder and brutal interrogation of thousands of Polish Jews and resistance fighters and supporters. In reprisal, 20 inmates of Pawiak were murdered in a public execution by the Nazis.

In November 1943, Operation Most III started. The Armia Krajowa provided the Allies with crucial intelligence on the German V-2 rocket. In effect some 50 kg of the most important parts of the captured V-2, as well as the final report, analyses, sketches and photos, were transported to Brindisi by a Royal Air Force Douglas Dakota aircraft. In late July 1944, the V-2 parts were delivered to London.

In early 1943 the strength of the forest-based groups can be estimated at about 40 groups numbering in total 1,200 to 4,000 fighters, but the numbers grew significantly next year.

1944

On 11 February 1944 the Resistance fighters of Polish Home Army's unit Agat executed Franz Kutschera, SS and Reich's Police Chief in Warsaw in action known as Operation Kutschera. In a reprisal of this action 27 February 140 inmates of Pawiak—Poles and Jews—were shot in a public execution by the Germans.

13–14 May 1944 the Battle of Murowana Oszmianka the largest clash between the Polish anti-Nazi Armia Krajowa and the Nazi Lithuanian Territorial Defense Force a Lithuanian volunteer security force subordinated to Nazi Germany. The battle took place in and near the village of Murowana Oszmianka in the Generalbezirk Litauen of Reichskommissariat Ostland. The outcome of the battle was that the 301st LVR battalion was routed and the entire force was disbanded by the Germans soon afterwards.

On 14 June 1944 the Battle of Porytowe Wzgórze took place between Polish and Russian partisans, numbering around 3,000, and the Nazi German units consisted of between 25,000 and 30,000 soldiers, with artillery, tanks and armored cars and air support.

On 25–26 June 1944 the Battle of Osuchy—one of the largest battles between the Polish resistance and Nazi Germany in occupied Poland during World War II—was fought, in what was essentially a continuation of the Zamość Uprising.

In 1943 the Home Army built up its forces in preparation for a national uprising. The plan of national anti-Nazi uprising on areas of prewar Poland was code-named Operation Tempest. Preparation began in late 1943 but the military actions started in 1944. Its most widely known elements were Operation Ostra Brama, Lwów Uprising and the Warsaw Uprising.

On 7 July, Operation Ostra Brama started.  Approximately 12,500 Home Army soldiers attacked the German garrison and managed to seize most of the city center. Heavy street fighting in the outskirts of the city lasted until 14 July. In Vilnius' eastern suburbs, the Home Army units cooperated with reconnaissance groups of the Soviet 3rd Belorussian Front. The Red Army entered the city on 15 July, and the NKVD started to intern all Polish soldiers. On 16 July, the HQ of the 3rd Belorussian Front invited Polish officers to a meeting and arrested them.

On 23 July the Lwów Uprising—the armed struggle started by the Armia Krajowa against the Nazi occupiers in Lwów during World War II—started. It started in July 1944 as a part of a plan of all-national uprising codenamed Operation Tempest. The fighting lasted until 27 July and resulted in liberation of the city. However, shortly afterwards the Polish soldiers were arrested by the invading Soviets and either forced to join the Red Army or sent to the Gulags. The city itself was occupied by the Soviet Union.

In August 1944, as the Soviet armed forces approached Warsaw, the government in exile called for an uprising in the city, so that they could return to a liberated Warsaw and try to prevent a communist take-over. The AK, led by Tadeusz Bór-Komorowski, launched the Warsaw Uprising. Soviet forces were less than 20 km away but on the orders of Soviet High Command they gave no assistance. Stalin described the uprising as a "criminal adventure". The Poles appealed to the Western Allies for help. The Royal Air Force, and the Polish Air Force based in Italy, dropped some munitions, but it was almost impossible for the Allies to help the Poles without Soviet assistance.

The fighting in Warsaw was desperate. The AK had between 12,000 and 20,000 armed soldiers, most with only small arms, against a well-armed German Army of 20,000 SS and regular Army units. Bór-Komorowski's hope that the AK could take and hold Warsaw for the return of the London government was never likely to be achieved. After 63 days of savage fighting the city was reduced to rubble, and the reprisals were savage. The SS and auxiliary units were particularly brutal.

After Bór-Komorowski's surrender, the AK fighters were treated as prisoners-of-war by the Germans, much to the outrage of Stalin, but the civilian population were ruthlessly punished. Overall Polish casualties are estimated to be between 150,000 and 300,000 killed, 90,000 civilians were sent to labor camps in the Reich, while 60,000 were shipped to death and concentration camps such as Ravensbrück, Auschwitz, Mauthausen and others. The city was almost totally destroyed after German sappers systematically demolished the city. The Warsaw Uprising allowed the Germans to destroy the AK as a fighting force, but the main beneficiary was Stalin, who was able to impose a communist government on postwar Poland with little fear of armed resistance.

1945

In March 1945, a staged trial of 16 leaders of the Polish Underground State held by the Soviet Union took place in Moscow - (Trial of the Sixteen).  The Government Delegate, together with most members of the Council of National Unity and the C-i-C of the Armia Krajowa, were invited by Soviet general Ivan Serov with agreement of Joseph Stalin to a conference on their eventual entry to the Soviet-backed Provisional Government. They were presented with a warrant of safety, yet they were arrested in Pruszków by the NKVD on 27 and 28 March.  Leopold Okulicki, Jan Stanisław Jankowski and Kazimierz Pużak were arrested on 27th with 12 more the next day.  A. Zwierzynski had been arrested earlier.  They were brought to Moscow for interrogation in the Lubyanka. After several months of brutal interrogation and torture, they were presented with the forged accusations of "collaboration with Nazi Germany" and "planning a military alliance with Nazi Germany".

In the latter years of the war, there were increasing conflicts between Polish and Soviet partisans. Cursed soldiers continued to oppose the Soviets long after the war. The last cursed soldier - member of the militant anti-communist resistance in Poland was Józef Franczak who was killed with pistol in his hand by ZOMO in 1963.

On 5 May 1945 in Bohemia, the Narodowe Siły Zbrojne brigade liberated prisoners from a Nazi concentration camp in Holiszowo, including 280 Jewish women prisoners. The brigade suffered heavy casualties.

On 7 May 1945 in the village of Kuryłówka, southeastern Poland, the Battle of Kuryłówka started. It was the biggest battle in the history of the Cursed soldiers organization - National Military Alliance (NZW). In battle against Soviet Union's NKVD units anti-communist partisans shot 70 NKVD agents. The battle ended in a victory for the underground Polish forces.

On 21 May 1945, a unit of the Armia Krajowa, led by Colonel Edward Wasilewski, attacked a NKVD camp in Rembertów on the eastern outskirts of Warsaw. The Soviets kept there hundreds of Poles, members of the Home Army, whom they were systematically deporting to Siberia. However, this action of the pro-independence Polish resistance freed all Polish political prisoners from the camp. Between 1944 and 1946, cursed soldiers attacked many communist prisons in Soviet-occupied Poland —see Raids on communist prisons in Poland (1944–1946).

From 10 to 25 June 1945, Augustów chase 1945 (the Polish Obława augustowska) took place. It was a large-scale operation undertaken by Soviet forces of the Red Army, the NKVD and SMERSH, with the assistance of Polish UB and LWP units against former Armia Krajowa soldiers in the Suwałki and Augustów region in Poland. The operation also covered territory in occupied Lithuania. More than 2,000 alleged Polish anticommunist fighters were captured and detained in Russian internment camps. 600 of the "Augustów Missing" are presumed dead and buried in an unknown location in the present territory of Russia. The Augustów Roundup was part of an anti-guerilla operation in Lithuania.

Formations 

 Antyfaszystowska Organizacja Bojowa
 Armia Krajowa
 Armia Ludowa
 Bataliony Chłopskie
 Brygada Swiętokrzyska
 Gwardia Ludowa
 Gwardia Ludowa WRN
 Narodowa Organizacja Wojskowa
 Narodowe Siły Zbrojne
 Obóz Polski Walczącej
 Państwowy Korpus Bezpieczeństwa
 Polish People's Army PAL
 Szare Szeregi
 Związek Odwetu
 Związek Walki Zbrojnej
 Żydowska Organizacja Bojowa
 Związek Organizacji Wojskowej
 Żydowski Związek Wojskowy

See also 

 Anti-fascism
 Bratnia Pomoc
 General Government
 History of Poland (1939–1945)
 Home Army and V-1 and V-2
 Lithuanian resistance during World War II
 Polish areas annexed by Nazi Germany
 Polish areas annexed by Soviet Union
 Polish partisans
 Polish resistance in France during World War II
 Resistance movement
 Western betrayal
 Yugoslav Partisans

Notes

a  A number of sources note that the Home Army, representing the bulk of Polish resistance, was the largest resistance movement in Nazi-occupied Europe. Norman Davies writes that the "Armia Krajowa (Home Army), the AK,... could fairly claim to be the largest of European resistance [organizations]." Gregor Dallas writes that the "Home Army (Armia Krajowa or AK) in late 1943 numbered around 400,000, making it the largest resistance organization in Europe." Mark Wyman writes that the "Armia Krajowa was considered the largest underground resistance unit in wartime Europe." The numbers of Soviet partisans were very similar to those of the Polish resistance.

References

Bibliography

External links 
 
 Armia Krajowa
 Die "Stunde W"
 Ann Su Caldwell, . Polonia Online.
 Polish Resistance in World War II
 Warsaw Uprising 1944
 History of Warsaw's contributions levied by the German Occupation Authority

Polish nationalism
Guerrilla organizations
 
Military units and formations of Poland in World War II